Duke of Decazes, also called Duke Decazes, is a title of French nobility that was granted in 1820 to Élie Decazes, a French statesman who served as Prime Minister of France from November 19, 1819 to February 20, 1820. He had already been made a French count in 1816. Separately, he was given the hereditary Danish title of Duke of Glücksbierg upon his second marriage in 1818, which title was recognized in France in 1822.

In 1826, he founded Houillères et Fonderies de l'Aveyron, a mining and metal-working business in the Aveyron département that marked the beginning of industrialised metallurgy. In 1829, the name of Decazeville was given to the principal centre of the industry.

List of Dukes
 Élie Decazes, 1st Duke Decazes and of Glücksbierg (1780–1868), Prime Minister of France 
 Louis-Charles-Élie-Amanien Decazes, 2nd Duke Decazes and of Glücksbierg (1819–86), French Foreign Minister
 Jean-Élie-Octave-Louis-Sévère-Amanien Decazes, 3rd Duke Decazes and of Glücksbierg (1864–1912), Olympic sailing competitor
 Louis-Jean-Victor-Sévère Decazes, 4th Duke Decazes and of Glücksbierg (1889–1941), businessman and owner of Haras d'Ouilly
 Élie Ludovic Henri Christian Decazes, 5th Duke Decazes and of Glücksbierg (1914–2011), President of the Polo de Paris from 1940 to 1950
 Louis-Frédéric-René-Marie-Edouard Decazes, 6th Duke Decazes and of Glücksbierg (b. 1946), wine producer

External links
 Decazes family website

Danish nobility